AKD Group is a Pakistani financial conglomerate based in Karachi, Pakistan. In 2013, Reuters described it as "one of Pakistan's largest domestic conglomerates" and The Independent described it as one of Pakistan's largest corporations. 

In 2018, Dawn described it as a "capital market giant," while that same year the UK's Daily Express described it as "leading Pakistani securities firm." The group operates in real estate, brokerage and financial services, infrastructure, natural resources and telecom sectors, including with its brokerage arm, investment house AKD Securities, which in 2002 launched the first online brokerage firm in Pakistan, AKD Trade. AKD Group's chairman is Aqeel Karim Dhedhi.

History 
AKD Group was founded in 1947 by Abdul Karim Dhedhi, father of the current chairman. It began business in 1973 as a brokerage house before expanding into investment banking and mutual funds. The group also sponsors sporting events as part of its Corporate Social Responsibility (CSR). In 2007, the group explored investing in four coal-fired power plants, but their initial offer was declined due to the fact that, though financial capacity was present, they lacked the technical ability to assure success. In 2011, ADK Group was committed to the development of the Gwadar port and naval base, but was permitted to pull out of the arrangement alongside their partners, the Port of Singapore Authority and the National Logistics Cell because 584 acres at the mouth of the port necessary for the development were not surrendered as expected by the Pakistan Navy.

In 2015, the company was among the first in Pakistan to create a real estate investment trust (REIT) management unit in response to easing of governmental regulations on investor ratios to create a trust to support the ongoing construction of the Arkadians. Arkadians is a 43-acre high-rise residential property that the ADK Group had been developing on behalf of the Defense Housing Authority at least since 2012. In March 2018, The National Assembly of Pakistan Standing Committee on Housing and Works praised the leadership of Dhedhi and the supervision of the AKD Group's CEO Ayesha Dhedhi in the quality construction of government accommodations to National Assembly members in the project.

The Group has experienced some controversy. In 2013, AKD Group came under scrutiny under allegations of insider trading when it, along with other traders, invested in the Sui Southern Gas Co. owned by the Pakistan government just before the gas company's prices went up. In 2017, three of the company's top officials were arrested during a raid of the company for investigation into possible fraud related to the Employees Old-Age Benefit Institution. In August 2018, AKD was cleared for lack of evidence, with a federal report titled "False implication of AKD Securities in EOBI scandal." During the investigation, the three officials remained jailed for months.

References

External links 
 

Conglomerate companies of Pakistan
1947 establishments in Pakistan
Conglomerate companies established in 1947
Companies based in Karachi